Ana María Pastor Julián (born 11 November 1957) is a Spanish doctor and politician for the People's Party who served as President of the Congress of Deputies from 19 July 2016 to 20 May 2019. Previously she was Minister of Health from 2002 to 2004 and Minister of Public Works from 2011 to 2016. Since 20 May 2019 is the Second Vice President of the Congress of Deputies.

Early life
Ana Pastor Julián was born in Cubillos del Pan, Zamora, she has a degree in Medicine and Surgery from the University of Salamanca and was an officer of the Senior Public Health and Health Administration.

Career
She has been Head of Health Service Planning of the delegation of provincial council of Pontevedra of Minister of Health of the Xunta de Galicia (Galician Government), and primary care manager in the province of Pontevedra and provincial council director of the Galician Health Service, SERGAS (Galician Health Service). She was general director of the General Mutual State Civil Servants (Muface). In the People's Party XV Congress she was elected executive secretary of Social Policy. She also became the coordinator of Social Participation of the party. She has represented Pontevedra Province in the Spanish Congress of Deputies since 2000, becoming second vice president of the Bureau of the Congress of Deputies until 13 December 2011.
On 22 December 2011, she was appointed Minister of Public Works and Transport of Spain.

On 11 March 2020, during the ongoing coronavirus pandemic, Pastor confirmed via Twitter she had tested positive for SARS-CoV-2.

President of Congress
On 18 July 2016 Pastor was designated by Mariano Rajoy as the People's Party candidate for President of Congress, with the support of Citizens. As speaker, she headed the lower house's nine-member executive committee.

Lobbying work
Ana Pastor Julián has been a patroness of Foundation for Analysis and Social Studies (FAES).

Honours

National Honours
: Dame Grand Cross of the  Order of Charles III

Foreign Honours
: Grand Cross of the Order of Merit (28 October 2014)
: Grand Cross of the Order of the Sun of Peru (27 February 2019)
: Grand cross of the Order of Christ (Portugal) (15 April 2018)

References

1957 births
21st-century Spanish women politicians
Grand Crosses of the Order of the Sun of Peru
Health ministers of Spain
Living people
Members of the 7th Congress of Deputies (Spain)
Members of the 8th Congress of Deputies (Spain)
Members of the 9th Congress of Deputies (Spain)
Members of the 10th Congress of Deputies (Spain)
Members of the 12th Congress of Deputies (Spain)
Members of the 13th Congress of Deputies (Spain)
Members of the 14th Congress of Deputies (Spain)
People from the Province of Zamora
Presidents of the Congress of Deputies (Spain)
Public works ministers of Spain
Spanish public health doctors
University of Salamanca alumni
Women government ministers of Spain
Women legislative speakers
Women members of the Congress of Deputies (Spain)
People's Party (Spain) politicians
20th-century Spanish women politicians
Women public health doctors